The rail crossing of the Connecticut River (United States) at this location originates from the Vermont and Massachusetts Railroad. The V&MRR was chartered in 1844 and completed an extension between Millers Falls, Massachusetts and Brattleboro, Vermont by 1850. Alvah Crocker, a paper and railroad magnate and U.S. Representative, was the first president of the V&MRR. Initially, the V&MRR was operated by Crocker's Fitchburg Railroad.

This rail bridge was used by Amtrak's Vermonter passenger service until December 2014.

Notes

References

General references 

 USGS Warwick, Massachusetts-New Hampshire-Vermont Quadrangle Map, March 1894, reprinted October 1915. Historic USGS Maps of New England & New York, University of New Hampshire Library Digital Collections Initiative.

Bridges over the Connecticut River
Railroad bridges in Massachusetts
Bridges in Franklin County, Massachusetts
Boston and Maine Railroad
Bridges completed in 1903
Metal bridges in the United States
Truss bridges in the United States
1903 establishments in Massachusetts